Steve Cassano (born March 7, 1942) is a retired American politician and former Deputy President Pro Tempore of the Connecticut State Senate, having first been elected as a member in 2010 and retiring at the end of 2022.  Cassano was succeeded in the Connecticut State Senate by MD Rahman. He previously served as mayor of Manchester, Connecticut, from 1991 to 2005. Cassano is an alumnus of Manchester Community College, Boston State College (BA), the University at Albany, SUNY (MA) and the University of Connecticut (MSW).

While in the Connecticut State Senate, he served as Co-Chair of the Planning & Development Committee, as a Vice Chair of the Finance Revenue and Bonding Committee and as a member of the Transportation, Public Safety, and Insurance and Real Estate Committees.

Connecticut Senate

Legislation 
In 2011, Cassano was co-sponsor of the house bill 6308, the bill that established the Connecticut Healthcare Partnership in accordance with the Affordable Care Act. In 2012, he co-sponsored bills to repeal the death penalty and legalize the use of medical marijuana. Since 2016 Cassano has introduced multiple bills regarding the unrestricted access to birth records for adult adopted individuals. Other co-sponsored bills include increasing the minimum wage, authorized driver's licenses for undocumented residents and capping the out of pocket costs for insulin.

Electoral history

References

1947 births
Living people
Democratic Party Connecticut state senators
Mayors of places in Connecticut
People from Manchester, Connecticut
Boston State College alumni
University at Albany, SUNY alumni
University of Connecticut alumni
21st-century American politicians